This is a list of people who live or lived in Pacific Palisades, Los Angeles.

 J. J. Abrams – director, screenwriter and creator of Alias and Lost (graduate of Palisades Charter High School)
 Ben Affleck – actor and director
 Eddie Albert – actor, past honorary mayor
 Judd Apatow – director, and wife Leslie Mann
 James Arness – actor known as Marshal Matt Dillon on CBS' Gunsmoke
 Lionel Atwill – actor
 Dan Aykroyd – actor, and wife Donna Dixon
 James Robert Baker – writer (committed suicide in his Pacific Palisades home in 1997)
 Ronald Barak (born 1943) – Olympic gymnast
 Christophe Beck – Film/TV Composer 
 Mel Blanc – voice actor, past honorary mayor
 Richard Boone – actor (Have Gun - Will Travel)
 Kobe Bryant – NBA player
 Francis X. Bushman – silent film star
 Chris Carter – writer, director, producer (The X-Files)
 Chevy Chase – actor, comedian, past honorary mayor
 Tommy Chong – actor, comedian (one half of the comedy duo Cheech & Chong)
 Martin Cohan – television writer and producer, creator of Who's the Boss?
 Stephen Collins – actor, 7th Heaven
 Bill Cosby - actor
 Bert Convy – actor, game show host, past honorary mayor
 Yvonne Craig – actress
 Denise Crosby – actress
 Billy Crystal – actor and comedian, former co-honorary mayor, along with his wife, Janice.
 Jamie Lee Curtis – actress
 Matt Damon – actor 
 Larry David – Seinfeld co-creator and star-creator of Curb Your Enthusiasm
 Geena Davis – actress, producer, activist
 Sydney Pollack – director, actor and producer
 Patti Davis – actress, daughter of Nancy and Ronald Reagan; describes growing up in the Palisades in her memoirs, including The Long Goodbye
 Dom DeLuise – actor, past honorary mayor
 Vlade Divac – NBA player
 Donna Dixon – actress, and husband Dan Aykroyd
 Charles and Ray Eames 
 Alden Ehrenreich – actor
Thelma "Tiby" Eisen (1922-2014) - baseball player
 Nanette Fabray – actress, singer, past honorary mayor
 Lion Feuchtwanger – German writer
 Buckminster Fuller – inventor (lived in Pacific Palisades until his death in 1983 at age 87)
 Jennifer Garner – actress
 John Goodman – actor
 Peter Graves – actor, past honorary mayor
 Brad Grey – producer and CEO of Paramount Pictures
 Christopher Guest – actor and director
 Steve Guttenberg – actor, past honorary mayor
 Brad Hall – actor
 Johnny Hallyday – singer 
 Tom Hanks – actor
 Goldie Hawn – actress
 Joseph Morgan Henninger – artist and illustrator
 Jennifer Love Hewitt – actress, television producer and director, singer/songwriter and author 
 Arthur Hill – actor
 Emile Hirsch – actor
 Oskar Homolka – actor
 Anthony Hopkins – actor, past honorary mayor
 Max Horkheimer – German philosopher of critical theory and the Frankfurt school
 Kate Hudson – actress
Nick Itkin (born 1999) - Olympic fencer, junior world champion
 Sylvia Juncosa – guitarist
 Karen Kane – fashion designer
 Stephen Kanner – modernist architect and co-founder of the A+D Museum
 Diane Keaton – actress
 Konrad Kellen – intelligence analyst and author
 Nicole Kidman – actress
 Ted Knight – actor, past honorary mayor
 Lorenzo Lamas – actor, martial artist and reality show participant
 Carole Landis – actress
 Joe Lando – actor
 Matt LeBlanc - actor most known for appearing as Joey Tribbiani on Friends
 Sugar Ray Leonard – boxer, former honorary mayor
 Eugene Levy, actor, comedian, current honorary mayor
 Jerry Lewis – comedian, actor, director, and past honorary mayor
 Shelley Long – actress
 Julia Louis-Dreyfus – actress
 Mike Love – band member of Beach Boys
 Gavin MacLeod – actor, past honorary mayor
 Leslie Mann – actress, and husband Judd Apatow
 Thomas Mann – Nobel Prize-winning German novelist
 Walter Matthau – actor, past honorary mayor
 John Mayer – singer
 Doug McClure – actor, past honorary mayor
 Ted McGinley – actor
 Patrick McGoohan – actor
 Nancy Meyers – director, writer, producer
 Henry Miller – author
 Poppy Montgomery – actress
 Rita Moreno – singer, dancer and multiple award-winning actress, past honorary mayor
 Jon Moscot – American-Israeli major league baseball pitcher (Cincinnati Reds)
 Randy Newman – musician, singer/songwriter, and film composer
 Stevie Nicks – singer
 Conan O'Brien – talk show host, moved to Pacific Palisades in 2012
 Chris O'Donnell – actor
 Amy O'Neill – former actress
 Paul N.J. Ottosson – three-time Oscar-winning sound designer
 Jack Owens – singer and songwriter of the 1940s, honorary mayor of Pacific Palisades in 1955
 Brad Paisley – country singer
 Alexandra Paul – actress and activist
 Anthony Quinn – actor
 John Raitt – actor, father of singer Bonnie Raitt
 Ronald Reagan – 40th President of the United States, governor and actor
 Joan Rivers – comedian (owned a home here as well as in New York)
 Karl L. Rundberg (1899–1969) – Los Angeles City Council member
 Kurt Russell – actor
 Bob Saget – actor, comedian, past honorary mayor
 Sabrina Scharf – actress and anti-pollution activist; wife of Bob Schiller
 Bob Schiller – television writer
 Geoff Schwartz – NFL football player
 Mitchell Schwartz – NFL football player
 Arnold Schwarzenegger – actor and former governor
 Vin Scully – baseball announcer (Los Angeles Dodgers)
 Derek Shearer – professor at Occidental College and former United States Ambassador to Finland, lives here as of 2009
 David Shore - Canadian television writer
 Martin Short and actress-wife Nancy Dolman (Soap) – lived in Pacific Palisades, past honorary mayor
 Maria Shriver – television journalist
 Sam Simon – writer, producer
 Alan Smolinisky – entrepreneur, real estate investor, owner of the Los Angeles Dodgers and the Palisadian-Post newspaper
 Evan Spiegel – co-founder and CEO of the American multinational technology and social media company Snap Inc.
 Steven Spielberg – director, producer
 Ken Steffes - 1986 National High School Player of the Year (Palisades High School), 1987 World Championships Partnership Winner with Forrest Smith, youngest to be ranked no. 1 with the Association of Volleyball Professionals at age 22, Olympic Athlete (Volleyball, 1996 Olympic Gold Medalist, 2020 induction into the USA Volleyball Hall of Fame as All-Time Great Male Beach Player Award, as of 2022 the highest winning percentage in the history of volleyball (48.6%)
 Robert Stoller – psychiatrist and author
 Hilary Swank – actress
 Thelma Todd – actress, found dead in her car in 1935 at Palisades home, above Roadside Cafe she operated on Pacific Coast Highway
 William J. Tuttle – Hollywood makeup artist
 Vivian Vance – actress, past honorary mayor
 Michael Waltman – actor
 Adam West – actor, past honorary mayor
 James Whale – director of horror films such as Dracula and Frankenstein
 Matty Whitmore – contestant on reality TV show Survivor: Gabon
 Kimberly Williams – actress
 Dennis Wilson – Beach Boys band member
 Rita Wilson – actor
 James Worthy – basketball player and TV commentator
 Gregg Zuckerman - mathematician, Yale University

References

Pacific Palisades, Los Angeles
Pacific Palisades